Carlia aramia is a species of skink, commonly known as the Aramia rainbow skink, in the genus Carlia. It is endemic to Papua New Guinea.

References

Carlia
Reptiles described in 2004
Reptiles of Papua New Guinea
Endemic fauna of Papua New Guinea
Taxa named by George Robert Zug
Skinks of New Guinea